Future Memories is the seventh studio album by German artist ATB, released on May 1, 2009.

Just like Two Worlds (2000) and Trilogy (2007) before it, this album also features two CDs. The first CD consists of dance songs, while the second one features chill-out tunes. Similarly to Trilogy, Future Memories also features 26 tracks in total and is released in two different versions: a normal one with two CDs, and a limited edition, which includes a DVD.

On the iTunes version of the album there are two bonus tracks, a full-length club remix of "L.A. Nights" and a 12-minute minimix featuring most songs from the album. This minimix was used to promote the album on YouTube.

Overview
ATB made almost all announcements concerning this new album on his MySpace blog. The first thing he said was that the album would not be promoted in the old-fashioned way, and a single would not be released before the album. Instead, there would be three tracks released at the same time (two of which are "What About Us" and "L.A. Nights") to represent the main album, and all three of them were going to have their own music videos. Also, four tracks on the album were going to have more than 160 beats per minute (bpm), rare in ATB's songs, but they were not anything close to the hardcore genre. The reason for some of the songs' high bpm was that for the first time in ATB's repertoire, he has incorporated drum and bass elements into some of the songs such as "What About Us" and "My Everything".

The opening to the song "Gravity" is similar melodically to the opening track on ATB's first album Movin' Melodies, entitled "The First Tones".

On March 30, 2009, ATB published a preview on YouTube that featured 10 selected tracks from the album, including "What About Us", "My Everything", "Summervibes with 9PM" and others.

Many singers and artists collaborated with ATB on this album, including Josh Gallahan, Haley Gibby (from Summer of Space), Betsie Larkin, Aruna, Tiff Lacey, Roberta Carter-Harrison (from Wild Strawberries), Apple&Stone, Jades and Flanders.

Track listing
ATB announced the official track list on March 27, 2009, on his MySpace blog.

Charts and certifications

Charts

Certifications

References

External links
 
 Future Memories cover
 ATB's MySpace Blog
 ATB's official website

2009 albums
ATB albums